William E Dorrington (1852–1926) was Chairman and Treasurer of the Manchester Royal Exchange Limited, a director of the London and North Western Railway Company (succeeded by the LMS), a Merchant and Shipper and formerly a major of the 3rd battalion  Cheshire Regiment of Volunteers.

References 

1852 births
1926 deaths